Seeing Other People is a 2004 American comedy film directed by Wallace Wolodarsky, who co-wrote the screenplay with Maya Forbes. The film stars Jay Mohr and Julianne Nicholson as a couple who decide to see other people two months before their wedding.

Plot

Ed and Alice are in love, but not passionate, ripping-clothes-off in love. They do laundry on Saturday, and do small things that make each other happy. At their engagement party, Alice sees a friend hook up with a server and comes to the conclusion that she would like to try more sexual partners before she settles down for the rest of her life.

Ed, initially resistant to the idea of seeing other people, decides to go along with it. Alice takes the lead by making out with a friend's contractor, Donald. When she tells Ed, he is shocked, but incredibly turned on. They have some of the best sex they have had in years. Ed attempts to have sex with an actress at work, but cannot perform. Alice finally psyches herself up to having sex with Donald at his house. She leaves satisfied but hurriedly, while Donald clearly has fallen for her.

That night, Alice tells Ed that she had sex with Donald. Ed never thought she would actually go that far. Upset, he leaves. He tries to hook up with different girls at a house party with his friend Carl, but none of his attempts goes well. He returns home to find Alice trying to call off the whole deal. Ed tells her that she is right and that he overreacted, but he says that they should continue the deal until she is completely satisfied so they have no regrets.

The next day, Ed succeeds in having sex with the actress. When he tells Alice, he expects her to be jealous, but instead she is turned on. They again have sex and believe things to be going well. Having sex outside their relationship is improving their sex life. Carl observes a woman (Penelope) in a stereo store who is being pressured by an overzealous sales clerk. He helps install a new system for Penelope and her son Jake. Jake is angry at his mother because of her recent divorce.

Ed has a date at a restaurant and turns out to be seated next to Alice and Donald; it is uncomfortable. Later, waiting for their cars, Ed and Alice talk. Ed is upset that Alice is seeing Donald, and she is upset that Ed has slept with so many women. Ed says they are supposed to be sleeping with other people, but she is just sleeping with one, as if it is a relationship. She says it is hard to sleep with other people with him living in the house. Ed agrees to move out.

Alice is growing tired of Donald because he is needy. Ed is getting tired of meaningless sex. He eventually starts dating a woman named Sandy and grows to like her more and more.

Breaking it off with Donald after finding out that he dates other women, Alice tries to get back with Ed. Ed, however, has feelings for Sandy at this point, but she is not quite what she seems. After a failed three-way in which the third girl straps on a dildo, Sandy suggests they try crack cocaine.

In a self-destructive impulse, Alice tries to sleep with her sister's husband Peter. Her sister is having an affair with Ed's friend Lou. She shows up and all is revealed. Alice misses how comfortable and happy she used to be.

Ed ends up stranded when Sandy runs off with his car after stealing a bag of crack. He walks all night and arrives at Alice's house just as everyone else is leaving. He pulls out a book of stamps that he bought weeks ago because he knew it to be one of the small things she loves. They sit side by side, not entirely sure where they go from here.

Main cast
Jay Mohr as Ed
Julianne Nicholson as Alice
Lauren Graham as Claire
Bryan Cranston as Peter
Josh Charles as Lou
Andy Richter as Carl
Helen Slater as Penelope
Alex Borstein as Tracy
Nicole Marie Lenz as Miranda
Mimi Rogers as Elise
Matthew Davis as Donald
Jonathan Davis as Ricky
Jill Ritchie as Sandy
Niki J. Crawford as Venita
Dylan McLaughlin as Jake
Lew Schneider as Marty
Shanna Moakler as Kasey
Mike Faiola as Tim
Sheeri Rappaport as Naomi
Riki Lindhome as Girl Kissing Ed (uncredited)
Liz Phair as Yoga Teacher (uncredited)

External links

2004 films
2004 romantic comedy films
2000s sex comedy films
American sex comedy films
Films directed by Wallace Wolodarsky
Films with screenplays by Wallace Wolodarsky
2000s English-language films
2000s American films